Landquart railway station may refer to one of several railway stations in Landquart, Switzerland: 

Landquart railway station
Landquart Ried railway station

See also
Igis railway station in Landquart municipality